The lock of a firearm is the mechanism used to initiate firing. It is a historical term, in that it generally refers to such mechanisms used in muzzle-loading and early breech-loading firearms.  Side-lock refers to the type of construction, in which the individual components of the mechanism are mounted either side of a single plate.  The assembly is then mounted to the stock on the side of the firearm.  In modern firearm designs, the mechanism to initiate firing is generally constructed within the frame or receiver of the firearm and is referred to as the firing or trigger mechanism.

Hand cannon

Hand cannon, the earliest of firearms, had arrived in Europe by  1338.  These cannons were loaded from the muzzle.  The propellent charge is lit through a touch hole.  A small priming charge over the touch hole is ignited with a lit piece of slow match or similar.  These hand cannons were ungainly: the difficulty being in holding and aiming the weapon while manipulating the slow burning fuse needed to fire it.  Improvements to the basic design placed the touch hole and a priming pan (flash pan) to the side of the barrel.  A cover to the priming pan allowed this to be filled with priming powder in advance of firing but there was no actual mechanism for firing.

Firelock

A firelock is a firearm in which the priming is ignited by sparks.  More specifically, it refers to the mechanism or lock of such firearms. It may also refer to a gun's lock which uses slow match to ignite the powder charge.

The matchlock was a lever mechanism that simplified the ergonomics of firing.  Slow match would be held clear of the flash pan in a spring-loaded pivoting arm (the serpentine).  Depressing the firing lever would dip the burning match into the flash pan.  The snap matchlock latched the serpentine back against spring tension.  Actuating the trigger or firing lever would release the serpentine, allowing it to rotate and dip the lit match into the priming pan.  This reduced hesitancy at the moment of firing and thereby improved accuracy.  However, rather than firing, the match might be snuffed out when it struck the flash pan.

The next advance was a self-igniting firearm that did not require a lit slow match to fire.  The first of this type is the wheellock.  The wheellock produces a spark in much the same way as a Zippo lighter.  Pyrite held against a rotating steel wheel produced a spark directed at the priming charge in the flash pan.  The wheel is rotated by a spring under tension. It would be wound up like a clock before each firing, held by a latch and fired by a lever that released the latch. To avert stalling, the pyrite would be lowered onto the rotating wheel rather than being permanently held against it.  The mechanism would also remove a cover from the flash pan at the moment of firing, sliding it forward.  The cover would retain the priming charge in the flash pan during transit.  The mechanism was altogether quite complicated. Consequently it was expensive and found limited use.

The next advance in firearm design was the snaplock, which used flint striking steel to generate the spark.  The flint is held in a rotating, spring-loaded arm called the cock.  This is held cocked by a latch and released by a lever or trigger.  The steel is curved and hinged. This accommodates the arc of the flint, maintaining contact with the steel. The spark produced is directed downward into the flash pan. The snaphance incorporates a mechanism to slide the pan cover forward at the moment of firing.  The doglock incorporates a second latch (or dog) as a safety mechanism that engages the cock in a halfway or half-cock position.  The dog is independent of the trigger.  The dog is only released when the lock is bought to the full-cock position.  The  miquelet lock is the penultimate of the flint-sparking locks.  It has an "L" shaped frizzen, the base of which, covers the flash pan and is hinged forward of the pan.  The flint strikes against the upright of the "L" and flips the frizzen forward to reveal the pan to the sparks created.  The miquelet lock also has a half-cock mechanism similar in function but differing in operation from the doglock.

The flintlock is also referred to as the true flintlock to distinguish it from other flint-sparking mechanisms.  It is also known as the French lock.  It uses a frizzen similar to the miquelet lock and has a half-cock position.  The distinction between the two locks is that the flintlock uses a single vertical sear  to latch the cock in both the cocked and half-cocked positions.  The sear is a lever that pivots in the vertical plane perpendicular to the axis of rotation of the cock and acts much like a pawl engaging the catch points of a ratchet gear.  The tumbler is similar in function to a ratchet gear. It is mounted on the inside of the lock-plate and has two catch-points corresponding to the half-cocked and full-cocked positions.  The half-cock catch-point is a V-notch into which the sear fits and cannot be levered away by the trigger to disengage the tumbler.

Firelock firing mechanisms are assembled either side of a mounting plate.  The assembly is then mounted to the side of the stock of the firearm.  The actual trigger may be separately mounted from the lock-plate.  Side lock refers to lock mechanisms of this general construction. It continued to be used in percussion-lock firearms and early firearm designs using metallic cartridges.

Percussion lock

The advent of the percussive ignition eliminated the need for a spark to discharge a firearm.  Instead, the discharge is initiated by striking a shock-sensitive explosive material.  Initial patents are attributed to the Reverend Alexander John Forsyth, who use a fulminate powder delivered from a charger that was integral to the lock mechanism.  The charger contained a firing pin that was struck and in turn, struck the fulminate. The mechanism was otherwise constructed similar to that of the flintlock.  The fulminate used in percussive locks was variously packaged as pills, metal tubes and paper patches but the percussion cap soon predominated.

The flintlock mechanism was readily adapted to utilise this new technology.  The flash pan was removed. A nipple (a small hollow cone) was fitted to the touchhole.  The percussion cap is fitted over the end of the nipple.  The cock was modified to strike the cap and redesignated as the hammer.  As a safety measure, the face of the hammer was soon hollowed to surround the cap.  As an economy, many existing flintlocks (particularly military stocks) were converted to use the percussion cap.  Most conversions modified rather than replaced the lock mechanism of the firearm being converted while lock designs in new models of longarms were largely unchanged.  Some designs emerged, such as Maynard carbine and the pellet feed system employed by the Sharps carbine, which mechanised the recharging of the primer but such systems were never widely adopted.

Percussion lock refers generally to firearms that use external percussive primers.  Cap lock and tube lock refer to percussion-lock firearms that utilised either cap or tube primers respectively.  Scent-bottle lock refers to a design by Forsyth.  The charger containing the fulminating powder resembles a scent bottle in shape.

Breechloaders

Early breech-loading, cap lock longarms, such as the Sharps carbine and the Wilson carbine used much the same side mounted lock mechanism as muzzle-loading cap-locks.

Revolvers

The commercially practical revolver followed from the advent of the percussion cap.  The action of cocking the hammer is used to rotate the cylinder and bring a loaded chamber in-line with the barrel preparatory to firing.  The mechanism for cocking, rotating and firing revolvers is contained between side-plates that form the frame of the revolver.  This is a significant departure from earlier lock mechanisms that were constructed about a single plate fixed to one side of a firearm.

Metallic cartridges

Metallic cartridges package projectile, propellant and primer together.  They are initiated by striking with a firing pin or striker that passes through the breechblock.  Early metallic-cartridge, single-shot breechloading rifles, such as the Snider–Enfield and the Springfield model 1873, continued to use side-mounted hammers and lock mechanisms that differed little from the cap lock and the flintlock in manufacture.  The firing pin is angled away from the axis of the barrel and toward the hammer, to accommodate the offset of the hammer.  The further development of breech-loading mechanisms and repeating firearms placed the components of the mechanism within the receiver or frame of the firearm.  This can be seen in the Martini–Henry, the Remington-Lee Model 1879 and the Winchester rifles.  The mechanism employed to open and close the breech is integrated with the firing mechanism to cock the firearm.  Improvements in spring technology has also resulted in cheaper helical coil springs in place of leaf and V springs.  The term lock is not generally used to refer to the firing or trigger mechanism of metallic cartridge firearms.

Boxlock

Side-by-side shotguns and hunting rifles continued to use side-locks until the advent of the boxlock patented by Anson and Deeley in 1875.  Side-lock shotguns have two separate lock plates mounted to the sides of the butt of the gun and not the receiver.  In the boxlock, the components of the firing mechanism are contained within the frame of the gun.  This simplified manufacture and significantly reduced costs.  While the boxlock is referred to as a hammerless gun, the hammers of the mechanism are concealed within the gun's frame. Side-lock shotguns continue to be made for the high-end market.

In culture

Lock, stock and barrel is a figure of speech referring to the totality of a firearm as: the barrel through which the bullet is directed toward a target, the stock which provides a means of gripping the firearm, and the lock as the firing mechanism.

See also
Bolt (firearms)
Doglock
Flintlock mechanism
Bolt action
Lever-action
Pump-action
Break-action
Falling-block action
Rolling block
Semi-automatic rifle

References

Firearm actions